Peter Liese (born 20 May 1965) is a German physician and politician who has been serving as a Member of the European Parliament since 1994. He is a member of the Christian Democratic Union, part of the European People's Party.

Education
 1991: Second state examination in medicine
 1989-1992: Graduated as doctor at the Institute of Humane Genetics of the University of Bonn

Early career
 until 1994: Ward doctor in Paderborn children's hospital
 since 1994: Doctor in general practice and internist

Political career

Career in state politics
 Former member of the Land executive of the Young Union, North Rhine-Westphalia
 1991-1997: District Chairman of the Junge Union
 Member of the Land executive of the CDU, North Rhine-Westphalia
 1989-1994: Member of Bestwig local council

Member of the European Parliament, 1994–present
Liese sits on the European Parliament's Committee on the Environment, Public Health and Food Safety, where he serves as the European People's Party Group’s coordinator. In this capacity, he was responsible for writing reports on including aviation within the European Union Emission Trading Scheme (2007) and an ETS reform (2021). In 2020, he also joined the Special Committee on Beating Cancer.

Liese is a substitute for the Committee on Industry, Research and Energy, a member of the Delegation for relations with the countries of Central America and a substitute for the Delegation to the EU-Mexico Joint Parliamentary Committee. He was part of the Parliament's delegations to the 2008 United Nations Climate Change Conference in Poznań, to the 2013 United Nations Climate Change Conference in Warsaw and to the 2016 United Nations Climate Change Conference in Marrakesh. 

In addition, Liese serves as member of the European Parliament Intergroup on the Welfare and Conservation of Animals and of the European Parliament Intergroup on Biodiversity, Countryside, Hunting and Recreational Fisheries. Previously, he was a member of the European Parliament Intergroup on Active Ageing and Intergenerational Solidarity. In 2014, he supported Françoise Grossetête’s proposal to establish a European Parliament Intergroup on Health for Citizens, including stakeholders such as the European Cancer Patients Association and the Organisation for European Cancer Institutes.

A member of the EPP Working Group on Bioethics and Human Dignity, Liese is known for his work on a human cells and tissues directive and conservative stance on stem cell research. Between 2000 and 2001, he served on the European Parliament’s Temporary Committee on Human Genetics and Other New Technologies in Modern Medicine.

Role in national politics
From 2012 until 2018, Liese was a member of the CDU leadership under the party’s successive chairwomen Angela Merkel (2012-2018) and Annegret Kramp-Karrenbauer (2018). In the negotiations to form a Grand Coalition of Merkel's Christian Democrats (CDU together with the Bavarian CSU) and the SPD following the 2013 federal elections, he was part of the CDU delegation in the working group on consumer protection. In similar negotiations following the 2017 federal elections, he was part of the working group on energy, climate protection and the environment, led by Armin Laschet, Georg Nüßlein and Barbara Hendricks.

In the negotiations to form a coalition government of the CDU and Green Party under Minister-President of North Rhine-Westphalia Hendrik Wüst following the 2022 state elections, Liese led his party’s delegation in the working group on the environment, agriculture and consumer protection; his counterparts from the Green Party were Jan-Niclas Gesenhues and Norwich Rüße.

Political positions
In a background paper presented to the EPP in summer 2017, Liese proposed to scrap the Strasbourg seat of the European Parliament and give the French city the European Medicines Agency (EMA) instead.

Ahead of the Christian Democrats’ leadership election in 2018, Liese publicly endorsed Friedrich Merz to succeed Angela Merkel as the party's chair.

Other activities
 Central Committee of German Catholics, Member (since 1997)
 German Industry Initiative for Energy Efficiency (DENEFF), Member of the Parliamentary Advisory Board
 Stiftung Zukunftsfähigkeit, Member of the Advisory Board
 St. Maria zur Wiese, Member of the Board of Trustees

References

External links
 
 

1965 births
Living people
People from Hochsauerlandkreis
University of Bonn alumni
Christian Democratic Union of Germany MEPs
MEPs for Germany 2019–2024
MEPs for Germany 2014–2019
MEPs for Germany 2009–2014
MEPs for Germany 2004–2009
MEPs for Germany 1999–2004
MEPs for Germany 1994–1999
Recipients of the Cross of the Order of Merit of the Federal Republic of Germany
Articles containing video clips